The Dellwood Seamounts are a seamount range located in the Pacific Ocean northwest of Vancouver Island, British Columbia, Canada. They are also known as the Dellwood Seamount Range or the Dellwood Seamount Chain.

See also
Volcanism of Canada
Volcanism of Western Canada
List of volcanoes in Canada

References

External links

Seamounts of the Pacific Ocean
Volcanoes of British Columbia
Mountain ranges of British Columbia
Seamount chains
Seamounts of Canada